Racekiela ryderi is a species of freshwater sponge in the family Spongillidae. It was first described by Edward Potts in 1882.   It was collected on Sable Island in 1899 by John Macoun, a biologist with the Geological Survey of Canada, and given the name Heteromeyenia macouni by A.H. Mackay in 1900. It was originally assumed to be endemic to Sable Island but is now considered to be the same species as  Racekiela ryderi, which is more broadly distributed.

References

Spongillidae
Sable Island
Sponges described in 1882